Marathon is a 2005 South Korean film directed by Jeong Yoon-cheol, and starring Cho Seung-woo and Kim Mi-sook. It received 5,148,022 admissions, making it the 4th most attended Korean film of 2005.

Based on the true story of Bae Hyeong-jin, an autistic marathon runner, the film popularized the South Korean term for autism which can be translated as "self-closed syndrome."

Plot
A young man with autism, named Cho-won, finds release only in running. As a child, Cho-won regularly had meltdowns, bit himself, and struggled to communicate with others—finding solace only in zebras and the Korean snack, choco pie. His mother never gave up on him and was determined to prove to the world that her child can achieve. As Cho-won gets older, he begins to find a passion for running and his mother is there to encourage and support him. Even though their family suffers from financial difficulties, they find a former marathon champion, Jung-wook — now a lethargic older man with an alcohol problem.

Jung-wook, who is serving community service hours as a physical education teacher for a DUI, grudgingly accepts the offer to train Cho-won in marathon running, but eventually becomes lazy with him. The coach often takes Cho-won's snack, and takes Cho-won to a jjimjilbang to relax. Even though Jung-wook slacks off most of the time, Cho-won's determination for running is firm (he accidentally runs 100 laps around a soccer field when the coach told him to without literally meaning it).

He takes third place in a 10 km running race, which causes his mother to set another goal for her son: to run a full marathon under three hours. This is not an easy task, however, as Cho-won wants to win but doesn’t know how to pace himself. Therefore, his mother pleads the coach to run with Cho-won in order to teach him how to pace his running. The movie shows the emotional struggles of a mother who is not sure if she is forcing her son to run or if it truly is his passion. The movie further explores and shows deep love and genuine purity through Cho-won.

Cast
 Cho Seung-woo as Cho-won
 Kim Mi-sook as Kyeong-sook, Cho-won's mother
 Lee Ki-young as Jung-wook
 Baek Sung-hyun as Yun Jung-won
 Ahn Nae-sang as Cho-won's father
 Jeon Su-ji as Se-yoon

Remake
A Japanese drama remake of the same title (マラソン) aired on TBS on September 20, 2007. It starred Ninomiya Kazunari in the lead role.

Awards and nominations

See also 
 Rain Man

References

External links 
  
 
 
 

2005 films
2005 biographical drama films
2000s sports drama films
South Korean sports drama films
South Korean biographical drama films
Biographical films about sportspeople
Running films
Films about autism
Films about parasports
Films shot in Seoul
Films directed by Jeong Yoon-cheol
Best Picture Grand Bell Award winners
Showbox films
2000s Korean-language films
Cultural depictions of South Korean people
Cultural depictions of track and field athletes
2005 directorial debut films
2005 drama films
South Korean films based on actual events
Grand Prize Paeksang Arts Award (Film) winners
2000s South Korean films